Michael Collins (born 1 May 1951) is a British former professional tennis player.

Collins, a native of London, competed on the professional tour during the 1970s. He featured in the main draw of the 1973 Wimbledon Championships and was runner-up to Jimmy Connors at the 1974 Manchester Open.

Outside of professional tennis, Collins played at collegiate level in the United States for Oklahoma State University. He is a long time resident of Victoria, Texas and works as a dentist.

References

External links
 
 

1951 births
Living people
British male tennis players
English male tennis players
Oklahoma State Cowboys tennis players
Tennis people from Greater London